Marion Seve (born 27 May 1995) is a Samoa international rugby league footballer who plays as a  for the Melbourne Storm in the NRL.

Early life
Seve was born in Ipswich, Queensland, Australia. He is the one of seven children of a Samoan boxer. Seve was educated at St Peter Claver College, Ipswich and then educated at Keebra Park State High School, Gold Coast, where he was the recipient of the Peter Sterling Medal after winning the 2013 GIO Schoolboy Cup. He was also a 2013 Australian Schoolboys representative.

Marion played his junior rugby league for Ipswich Brothers and played representative football with Wests Tigers until 2016 where he signed with the Brisbane Broncos.

In 2018, Seve signed with the Melbourne Storm mid season.

Playing career
In Round 2 of the 2019 NRL season, Seve made his debut for Melbourne against Canberra. He had his Melbourne jersey presented to him by Melbourne head coach Craig Bellamy.  Seve mid season was named in the Toa Samoa team to make his international debut. During the post-season, he was named in the Samoan team to contest the 2019 Rugby League World Cup 9s.  Seve made seven appearances for Melbourne in the 2020 NRL season but did not play in the club's finals campaign or grand final victory over Penrith.  Seve played two games for Melbourne in the 2021 NRL season scoring two tries but did not play in the club's finals series where they lost to eventual premiers Penrith in the preliminary final.

References

External links
Melbourne Storm profile
Toa Samoa profile

1995 births
Living people
Australian rugby league players
Australian sportspeople of Samoan descent
Samoa national rugby league team players
Rugby league second-rows
Eastern Suburbs Tigers players
Souths Logan Magpies players
Rugby league centres
Melbourne Storm players
Rugby league players from Ipswich, Queensland